Branko Gajin (born 5 November 1958) is a politician in Serbia. He was the mayor of Srbobran from 2004 to 2012 and served in the Assembly of Vojvodina from 2008 to 2011. For much of his time as an elected official, Gajin was not a member of any political party.

Private career
Gajin is a lawyer and has been the co-owner of the pharmacy "Eliksir" in Srbobran.

Politician
Gajin sought election to the National Assembly of Serbia in the 1990 parliamentary election, running in the division of Temerin and Srbobran with a combined endorsement from the Serbian Renewal Movement and the People's Radical Party. He was defeated by Milan Krčedinac of the Socialist Party of Serbia.

Serbia introduced the direct election of mayors in the 2004 local elections, and Gajin was elected as mayor of Srbobran as an independent candidate, leading a local citizens' group called the "Alliance for Srbobran." He subsequently joined the Democratic Party of Serbia (Demokratska stranka Srbije, DSS), although he resigned his membership in June 2007, citing (among other things) the DSS's delay in forming a government at the republic level.

The direct election of mayors was abandoned after 2004; in all local election cycles since then, mayors have been chosen by the elected members of city and municipal assemblies. Gajin led his independent electoral list to victory in the 2008 local elections with thirteen out of twenty-eight mandates, and he was chosen afterwards for a second term as mayor. He was also elected to the Assembly of Vojvodina in the concurrent 2008 Vojvodina provincial election as an independent candidate in the Srbobran constituency. He resigned from the latter role on 24 October 2011, after restrictions were introduced on holding dual mandates.

Gajin announced an alliance between his movement and the Democratic Party (Demokratska stranka, DS) in Srbobran in 2009. In the 2012 local elections, he sought re-election as mayor at the head of a combined list. The list won a plurality victory with nine mandates, but the Socialist Party (which finished second) was able to form a coalition government with other parties, and Gajin's term as mayor came to an end. 

He later left the DS and again led his own list in the 2016 local elections. The list finished in second place with seven mandates; the Serbian Progressive Party won the election and was subsequently able to form a new government. Gajin served in the assembly until 2020 and was not a candidate in that year's municipal election.

Electoral record

Assembly of Vojvodina

Municipality of Srbobran

National Assembly of Serbia

References

1958 births
Living people
People from Srbobran
Members of the Assembly of Vojvodina
Mayors of places in Serbia
Democratic Party of Serbia politicians